The City Municipality of Ljubljana, also the City of Ljubljana (acronym MOL) is one of twelve city and metropolitan municipalities in Slovenia. Its seat is Ljubljana, the largest and capital city of Slovenia. , its mayor is Zoran Janković.

Administrative division 

The City Municipality of Ljubljana comprises 17 districts: the Bežigrad District, Center District, Črnuče District, Dravlje District, Golovec District, Jarše District, Moste District, Polje District, Posavje District, Rožnik District, Rudnik District, Sostro District, Šentvid District, Šiška District, Šmarna Gora District, Trnovo District, and Vič District.

These are represented by district councils (Slovene singular:  or ).

Economy
The budget of MOL was 346,505,748 euros for 2011. It was shaped by the sell of land lot and the construction of the Stožice Sports Park. With 125 million euros of debt, MOL was the most indebted Slovenian municipality in April 2010.

Holiday
Since 1945, the holiday of the City of Ljubljana has been celebrated on 9 May. At that day, the liberation of the city from German occupation during World War II was announced in 1945. In 1964, the holiday was added to the statute of the municipality as "the day of the liberation of Ljubljana in the victorious national liberation war 1941–1945". Since 1995, it has been known as "the day of freedom and peace". In 1995, despite disagreements, 14 April was added to the statute as the date of the first mention of Ljubljana in written sources, based on a document from 1243.

The holiday on 14 April was much less known than the holiday on 9 May. In February 2011, the mayor presented a proposal to only celebrate 9 May to the municipal council, because it was inexpedient for Ljubljana to be the only municipality in Slovenia to celebrate two days as municipal holidays, and to celebrate the municipal holiday on the date of the first mention, which may change with time. The proposal was passed by the municipal council and became valid in February 2012. Since then, the only holiday of the City Municipality of Ljubljana has been 9 May, the day of freedom and peace.

Settlements

In addition to the municipal seat of Ljubljana, the municipality also includes the following settlements:

 Besnica
 Brezje pri Lipoglavu
 Dolgo Brdo
 Dvor
 Češnjica
 Črna Vas
 Gabrje pri Jančah
 Janče
 Javor
 Lipe
 Mali Lipoglav
 Mali Vrh pri Prežganju
 Malo Trebeljevo
 Medno
 Pance, Ljubljana
 Podgrad
 Podlipoglav
 Podmolnik
 Prežganje
 Ravno Brdo
 Rašica
 Repče
 Sadinja Vas
 Selo pri Pancah
 Spodnje Gameljne
 Srednje Gameljne
 Stanežiče
 Šentpavel
 Toško Čelo
 Tuji Grm
 Veliki Lipoglav
 Veliko Trebeljevo
 Vnajnarje
 Volavlje
 Zagradišče
 Zgornja Besnica
 Zgornje Gameljne

References

External links 

 City Municipality of Ljubljana homepage
 City Municipality of Ljubljana at Geopedia

 
Ljubljana
1994 establishments in Slovenia
Populated places established in 1994